Aytakin Israel oglu Mammadov (29 May 1967, Gadabay, Azerbaijan SSR – December 1991, Goygol, Azerbaijan Republic) — was the military serviceman of Azerbaijan Armed Forces, warrior during the First Nagorno-Karabakh War and National Hero of Azerbaijan.

Early life and education 
Mammadov was born on 29 May 1967 in Gadabay, Azerbaijan SSR. In 1984, he completed his secondary education. He had served in the Soviet Army during 1985–1987.

First Nagorno-Karabakh War 
Mammadov had entered Ministry of Internal Affairs (Azerbaijan) Special Forces in 1991 and was sent to Goygol against Armenian troops.

On December, 1991, he was killed in one of the battles around Goygol District.

Honors 
Aytakin Israel oglu Mammadov was posthumously awarded the title of the "National Hero of Azerbaijan" by Presidential Decree No. 264 dated 8 October 1992.

He was buried at the Gokeli village cemetery.

A school in Gokeli village of the Gadabay Rayon of Azerbaijan was named after him. In 2013, he also shot a documentary feature film "Heroes of the Unconquerable
of Castle", which tells the life and war of three other National Heroes of Gadabay - Isgender Aznaurov, Ilham Aliyev and Mazahir Rustamov.

See also 
 First Nagorno-Karabakh War
 List of National Heroes of Azerbaijan

References

Sources 
 Vugar Asgarov. Azərbaycanın Milli Qəhrəmanları (Yenidən işlənmiş II nəşr). Bakı: "Dərələyəz-M", 2010, səh. 269.

Azerbaijani military personnel of the Nagorno-Karabakh War
National Heroes of Azerbaijan
1967 births
1991 deaths